Lithuania has participated at the Youth Olympic Games in every edition since the inaugural 2010 Games and has earned gold medals from every Summer edition.

Medal tables

Medals by Summer Games

Medals by Winter Games

Medals by summer sport

Medals by winter sport

List of medalists

Summer Games

Summer Games medalists as part of Mixed-NOCs Team

Winter Games medalists as part of Mixed-NOCs Team

Flag bearers

See also
Lithuania at the Olympics
Lithuania at the Paralympics

References

External links
Lithuanian Olympic Committee

Lithuania at the Youth Olympics
Youth Olympics
Nations at the Youth Olympic Games
Youth sport in Lithuania